Sherryl Clark is an American film producer.

Filmography
Clark has produced the following movies:
 Twisted, (2004), co-producer
 Cloverfield, (2008), executive
 Morning Glory, (2010), executive
 Plush, (2013)
 Fathers and Daughters, (2015)
 Viral, (2016)
 Wish Upon, (2017)
 Blackbird, (2019)

She is a co-founder of the production group H Collective.

References 

American film producers
Living people
Year of birth missing (living people)